Darvi may refer to:
 Darvi, Govi-Altai, Mongolia
 Darvi, Khovd, Mongolia
 Bella Darvi